Pio Chirinos (born 17 July 1929) is a Venezuelan wrestler. He competed in the men's freestyle middleweight at the 1952 Summer Olympics.

References

External links
 

1929 births
Possibly living people
Venezuelan male sport wrestlers
Olympic wrestlers of Venezuela
Wrestlers at the 1952 Summer Olympics
Place of birth missing (living people)